Phaedrolosaurus is a genus of theropod dinosaur, based on a single tooth possibly from the Valanginian-Albian-age Lower Cretaceous Lianmugin Formation of Wuerho, Xinjiang, China.

Discovery and naming
The first known remains of Phaedrolosaurus were discovered in China during an Institute of Vertebrate Paleontology and Paleoanthropology (IVPP) expedition to China's Wuerho area in 1964. The tooth, IVPP V , was in 1973 described and named by Dong Zhiming as a new genus and species. The type species is Phaedrolosaurus ilikensis. The generic name is derived from the Greek φαιδρός, phaidros, "elated", referring to the agility of the animal. The specific name refers to the Ilike Formation. Dong stated the thirty-one millimetre long tooth was like those of Deinonychus, albeit thicker, shorter, and more solid. He regarded the new genus as a possible dromaeosaurid.

As part of the type material of this genus Dong described several skeletal elements from other sites, among them a partial, articulated right leg. Because this latter limb material showed autapomorphies, distinctive characteristics, and there was no reason to connect it to the nondiagnostic tooth, Rauhut and Xu in 2005 gave this material its own name, Xinjiangovenator parvus.  They also recommended regarding Phaedrolosaurus as a nomen dubium, a dubious name. Because Dong had not designated a holotype among the several specimens in 1973 assigned to Phaedrolosaurus, in 1977 Hans-Dieter Sues had made the tooth the lectotype.

References

Prehistoric coelurosaurs
Early Cretaceous dinosaurs of Asia
Nomina dubia
Taxa named by Dong Zhiming
Fossil taxa described in 1973
Paleontology in Xinjiang